Nicolas Vivas Rosaly (22 September 1924 – 8 October 1999) was a Puerto Rican weightlifter. He competed in the men's bantamweight event at the 1952 Summer Olympics.

References

1924 births
1999 deaths
Puerto Rican male weightlifters
Olympic weightlifters of Puerto Rico
Weightlifters at the 1952 Summer Olympics
Sportspeople from Ponce, Puerto Rico
20th-century Puerto Rican people